The South Australian Railways V class was a class of 0-4-4 steam locomotives operated by the South Australian Railways.

History
In November 1876 the South Australian Railways took delivery of four 0-4-4 locomotives from Beyer, Peacock & Co, Manchester for use on the lightly laid Kingston-Naracoorte railway line. After final assembly was completed in South Australia, all entered service between January and May 1877. They were built to the same design as the Norwegian State Railways V1 class.

They were not a success being too light and having insufficient water capacity for the 84 kilometre journey, requiring a water gin to be attached. In 1879, two W class locomotives were transferred with V9 becoming the shunter at Kingston wharf and the other three stored.

In 1882, V12 was returned to service at Port Germein before moving to Port Pirie, while in the same year V10 was transferred to Port Wakefield, the latter was joined by V11 in 1885. In  1888, V9 moved to Port Augusta. From November 1891 until May 1893, V11 was loaned to BHP to operate on its lightly laid Broken Hill network. All four were rebuilt between 1891 and 1896. Between September and December 1893, a further four were delivered from James Martin & Co.

They operated at various locations including Peterborough, Port Lincoln, Terowie and Wallaroo. Some were loaned interstate during the construction of the Yallourn Power Station. Most were withdrawn in the 1930s and 1940s with V9 plinthed at Pioneer Park, Naracoorte.

Class list

References

Literature
  Frank Stamford: And the tail-waggers did all right … The Kingston–Naracoorte Railway in the 1870s  – Part 2. In: Light Railways - Australia’s Magazine of Industrial & Narrow Gauge Railways, No 254, April 2017. Pages 16-25.

External links

Beyer, Peacock locomotives
Railway locomotives introduced in 1876
V
3 ft 6 in gauge locomotives of Australia
0-4-4 locomotives